Rhathamictis perspersa is a moth of the family Incurvariidae. It was described by Edward Meyrick in 1924. It occurs in New Zealand.

The wingspan is about 14 mm. The head, palpi and thorax are grey. The forewings are dark purple grey with scattered whitish-ochreous dots and strigulae. The hindwings are dark purple.

The larvae weave themselves cases similar to those of various species in the families Tineidae and Psychidae, and accordingly the genus has at various times been assigned to each of those two families, because for many years there was only a single specimen to work from. In fact there are other sources of confusion, the specific epithet has at times been spelt perspera, and as its derivation and intended meaning are unclear, it is not a simple matter to decide which is definitively correct. For example, The New Zealand annotated catalogue of Lepidoptera lists it under Tineidae as: "Rhathamictis Meyrick, 1924b, p. 662. Type species Mallobathra perspera Meyrick, by original monotypy ... perspera Meyrick, 1924b, p. 662 (Rhathamictis) Wellington WN, G.V. Hudson; HT [m] unique, BMNH. Hudson 1928, p. 344, pl. xl fig. 16; 1950, p. 113, pl. iv fig. 7." However, it also is referred to as a "carnivorous Psychid" in the natural history journal Weta. As these citations show, the generic assignment also has changed from its original description as belonging in the genus Mallobathra; it now is assigned to Rhathamictis.

Little is known of its habits, but according to a study the case-bearing larvae live largely under the loose bark of trees and feed on inert animal matter, either live, such as pupae and the eggs of invertebrates, or animal detritus, such as dead moths. Under such trees the abandoned cases may be numerous, and indicate that the adult eclosion season is late summer and that the species is univoltine. Available evidence suggests that only males have functional wings, the females being brachypterous, if not actually wingless. The cases are brown and are neat in construction; the case of the mature larva is about 8 mm in length.

References

Moths described in 1924
Incurvariidae
Moths of New Zealand